Henning Haahr Andersen is a mathematician specializing in Algebraic groups, Lie algebras, Quantum groups and Representation theory.

Andersen received his Ph.D. from the Massachusetts Institute of Technology in 1977 under the supervision of Steven Lawrence Kleiman.

In 2012, Andersen became a fellow of the American Mathematical Society.

References

Year of birth missing (living people)
Living people
Fellows of the American Mathematical Society
20th-century Danish mathematicians
21st-century  Danish mathematicians
Massachusetts Institute of Technology School of Science alumni
Academic staff of Aarhus University